Craig Jackson Calhoun  (born 1952) is an American sociologist, currently University Professor of Social Sciences at Arizona State University. An advocate of using social science to address issues of public concern, he was the Director of the London School of Economics and Political Science from September 2012 until September 2016, after which he became the first president of the Berggruen Institute. Prior to leading LSE, Calhoun led the Social Science Research Council, and was University Professor of the Social Sciences at New York University and Director of NYU's Institute for Public Knowledge. With Richard Sennett he co-founded NYLON, an interdisciplinary working seminar for graduate students in New York and London who bring ethnographic and historical research to bear on politics, culture, and society.

Biography 
Calhoun was born in Watseka, Illinois, on June 16, 1952. He studied anthropology and cinema at the University of Southern California (B.A., 1972), anthropology and sociology at Columbia University (M.A., 1974), and social anthropology at Manchester University (M.A., 1975). He received his D.Phil. in sociology and modern social and economic history from University of Oxford in 1980, where he was a student of J.C. Mitchell, Angus MacIntyre, and R.M. Hartwell. He taught at the University of North Carolina at Chapel Hill from 1977 to 1996. There he was also Dean of the Graduate School and founding Director of the University Center for International Studies. He moved to NYU in 1996 as Chair of the Department of Sociology in a period of major rebuilding. He left for Columbia in 2006 but returned to NYU as Director of the Institute for Public Knowledge (IPK), which promotes collaborations among academics from diverse disciplinary backgrounds and between academics and working professionals. In September 2012 he became the Director and President of the London School of Economics. Calhoun has also taught at the Beijing Foreign Studies University, the Ecole des Hautes Etudes en Sciences Sociales, University of Asmara, University of Khartoum, University of Oslo, and Oxford itself. He was Benjamin Meaker Distinguished Visiting Professor at the University of Bristol in 2000 and received an honorary doctorate from La Trobe University in Melbourne in 2005.

Calhoun is married to Pamela F. DeLargy, who is a public health and Horn of Africa specialist, and who served in the United Nations in Eritrea, Sudan, Sierra Leone and headed the humanitarian response programmes of UNFPA for a decade. She is currently Senior Advisor to Peter Sutherland, the U.N. Special Representative for Migration.

Work 
From 1999 to 2012 Calhoun was President of the Social Science Research Council. At the SSRC Calhoun emphasized the public contributions of social science. His views are explained in his essay "Towards a More Public Social Science", which first appeared in the SSRC's 2004 "President's Report" and has been translated, reprinted and widely circulated on the web. After September 11, 2001 he launched an initiative on "Real Time Social Science" which included an essay forum that attracted more than one million readers. This continued with work on the Privatization of Risk, Understanding Katrina: Perspectives from the Social Sciences Program, and now Haiti, Now and Next (examining the impact of the 2010 earthquake on Haiti's social and political future). His conversations with Paul Price have received wide circulation, podcast as Societas.

Calhoun has written more than 100 scholarly articles and chapters as well as books, among which his most famous is a study of the Tiananmen Square protests of 1989, Neither Gods Nor Emperors: Students and the Struggle for Democracy in China (California, 1994). Calhoun's work has been translated into more than a dozen languages. Thesis Eleven (2006, Vol. 84, No. 1) devoted a special issue to his work, "Craig Calhoun: Critical Social Sciences and the Public Sphere." He was also editor in chief of the Oxford Dictionary of the Social Sciences. His recent work has focused on the future of capitalism and on humanitarianism. He has also written on Brexit and the rise of populism.

As the Director of the London School of Economics and Political Science Calhoun was in the academic year 2012-13 the beneficiary of "one of the biggest increases in overall pay and benefits" in the British higher education sector. As Director, Calhoun was very successful in raising funds for the LSE, including millions from the Marshall Foundation, Atlantic Philanthropies, and many other donors. Also during his tenure, LSE begun work on a new Global Centre for Social Sciences, and rose significantly in global university rankings, rising from 71st to 35th best university in the world between 2014 and 2015 in QS World University Rankings. In December 2015 it was announced he would not seek a further term at LSE, instead choosing to step down and return to the United States in 2016 as President of the Berggruen Institute in Los Angeles. In August 2017, British media published critical reports that Calhoun had been paid £1.7 million over four years and a London apartment with a market rent of £120,000 a year, despite LSE being criticised for its low teaching standards.

As president of the Berggruen Institute, Calhoun launched the million-dollar Berggruen Philosophy Prize, and oversaw the development of its Los Angeles and Beijing campuses. In May 2018, it was announced that Calhoun would be stepping down from the Berggruen Institute in order to become University Professor of Social Sciences at Arizona State University, effective July 1, 2018.

Honours

 2012: Elected an member of the American Philosophical Society.
2014: Honorary doctorate from the Erasmus University Rotterdam, for being "one of today´s foremost social scientists".
 2015: Fellow of the Academy of Social Sciences (FAcSS)
 2015: Fellow of the British Academy (FBA)
He is a Fellow of the New York Institute for the Humanities.

Publications 
Monographs

 

 
 
 
  with Donald Light and Suzanne Keller
 

Edited Volumes

 Calhoun, Craig; Eduardo Mendieta, and Jonathan VanAntwerpen. (2013) Habermas and Religion. Polity Press.
Wallerstein, Immanuel; Randall Collins, Michael Mann, Georgi Derluguian, and Craig Calhoun. (2013). Does Capitalism Have a Future? Oxford University Press. 
Calhoun, Craig, Mark Juergensmeyer, and Jonathan VanAntwerpen. (2011) Rethinking Secularism. Oxford University Press. 
 Michael Warner, Jonathan VanAntwerpen, and Craig Calhoun. (2010) Varieties of Secularism in a Secular Age. Harvard University Press.
 Calhoun, Craig and Sennett, Richard. (2007) Practicing Culture. Routledge.
 Calhoun, Craig; Gerteis, Joseph; Moody, James; Pfaff, Steven; and Indermohan Virk. (2007) Contemporary Sociological Theory, 2nd. ed. Blackwell.
 Calhoun, Craig; Gerteis, Joseph; Moody, James; Pfaff, Steven; and Indermohan Virk. (2007) Classical Sociological Theory, 2nd. ed. Blackwell.
 Calhoun, Craig. (2007) Sociology in America: A History. University of Chicago Press.
 Calhoun, Craig; Rojek, Chris; and Turner, Bryan. (2006) Sage Handbook of Sociology. Sage Publications.
 Calhoun, Craig. (2005) Lessons of Empire: Imperial Histories and American Power. New Press.
 Calhoun, Craig; Price, Paul; and Timmer; Ashley. (2002) Understanding September 11. The New Press.
 Calhoun, Craig. (2002) Dictionary of the Social Sciences. Oxford University Press.
 Calhoun, Craig, and McGowan John. (1997) Hannah Arendt and the Meaning of Politics. University of Minnesota Press.
 Calhoun, Craig. (1994) Social Theory and the Politics of Identity. Wiley Blackwell. 
 Calhoun, Craig; LiPuma, E.; and Postone; M. (1993) Bourdieu: Critical Perspectives. Cambridge: Polity Press and Chicago: University of Chicago Press.
 Calhoun, Craig. (1992) Habermas and the Public Sphere. Cambridge, MA: MIT Press.
 Calhoun, Craig; Scott, W.R.; and Meyer, M. (1990) Structures of Power and Constraint: Essays in Honor of Peter M. Blau. Cambridge and New York: Cambridge University Press.
 Calhoun, Craig and Ianni, F. A. J. (1976) The Anthropological Study of Education. The Hague: Mouton, and Chicago: Aldine.

References

External links 
 LSE profile page
Calhoun's bio, Institute for Public Knowledge
 Social Science Research Council (USA)

American sociologists
Living people
Scholars of nationalism
1952 births
New York University faculty
People associated with the London School of Economics
Academic staff of the University of Khartoum
University of Southern California alumni
Columbia Graduate School of Arts and Sciences alumni
Alumni of the University of Manchester
Academic staff of the University of Asmara
Fellows of the British Academy
Alumni of St Antony's College, Oxford
Fellows of the Academy of Social Sciences
Social Science Research Council
Columbia University faculty